Pellegrino Parmense is a comune (municipality) in the Province of Parma in the Italian region Emilia-Romagna, located about  west of Bologna and about  west of Parma, in the northern part of the Valle del Ceno.

References

Cities and towns in Emilia-Romagna